The 2020 Alps Tour was the 20th season of the Alps Tour, one of four third-tier tours recognised by the European Tour.

Schedule
The following table lists official events during the 2020 season.

Order of Merit
The Order of Merit was based on prize money won during the season, calculated using a points-based system. The top three players on the tour (not otherwise exempt) earned status to play on the 2021 Challenge Tour.

Notes

References

Alps Tour